The 2018–19 season is 28th season of Odessa football club "Chornomorets" in the championships / cups of Ukraine, and 81rd season in the history of the club. This season "Chornomorets" competed in Premier League and Ukrainian Cup. After finishing at 11th place in the Premier league, "Chornomorets" lost to "Kolos" (Kovalivka) in play-offs and was relegated to First League.

Players

Squad information

Transfers

In

Out

Pre-season and friendlies

Competitions

Overall

Premier League

League table

Results summary

Results by round

Matches

Relegation round

Ukrainian Cup

Statistics

Appearances and goals

|-
! colspan=16 style=background:#dcdcdc; text-align:center| Goalkeepers

|-
! colspan=16 style=background:#dcdcdc; text-align:center| Defenders

|-
! colspan=16 style=background:#dcdcdc; text-align:center| Midfielders 

|-
! colspan=16 style=background:#dcdcdc; text-align:center| Forwards

|-
! colspan=16 style=background:#dcdcdc; text-align:center| Players transferred out during the season

Last updated: 8 June 2019

Goalscorers

Last updated: 8 June 2019

Clean sheets

Last updated: 8 June 2019

Disciplinary record

Last updated: 8 June 2019

References

External links
 Official website

FC Chornomorets Odesa seasons
Chornomorets Odesa